Cale may refer to:

People
 Cale (name), including a list of people and fictional characters with the name
 Calé, an endonym used by Romani subgroups in Spain and Portugal

Places
 Cale, Arkansas, a town in Nevada County, Arkansas, United States
 Cale, Indiana, an unincorporated community in Martin County, Indiana, United States
 Portus Cale, an ancient town and port in northern Portugal

Other uses
 Cale, a common name for fish in the family Odacidae
 Cale:Drew, a 2003 album by New Zealand band Jakob

See also
 Cales, an ancient city of Campania in southern Italy
 Calès (disambiguation)
 Kale (disambiguation)